A day-fine, day fine, unit fine or structured fine is a unit of fine payment that, above a minimum fine, is based on the offender's daily personal income. A crime is punished with incarceration for a determined number of days, or with fines. As incarceration is a financial punishment, in the effect of preventing work, a day-fine represents one day incarcerated and without salary. It is argued to be just, because if both high-income and low-income population are punished with the same jail time, they should also be punished with a proportionally similar income loss. An analogy may be drawn with income tax, which is also proportional to the income, even progressively.

Jurisdictions employing the day-fine include Denmark, Estonia, Finland, France, Germany, Sweden, Switzerland, and Macao.

By country

Germany
Germany has utilized day fines since 1969.

Denmark

Violations of the Danish Penal Code may be punishable by up to 60 day-fines, when the severity of a crime does not call for a custodial sentence.

Fines issued under other laws (e.g. the traffic code) are not day-fines and do not ordinarily scale.
Exceptions include fines for driving under the influence or without a valid license, which (although not technically day-fines) scale with income.
Fines that do not scale may still be reduced by half (to a minimum of DKK 500) for offenders who are under 18 or whose gross annual income does not exceed DKK 171,795 (as of 2020).

Finland

In Finland, the day-fine system is used for most crimes that are punishable by way of a fine. The system has been in use since 1921. Most minor infractions are punished with a fixed petty fine (rikesakko, ordningsbot) such as minor traffic and water traffic violations, littering, and breaches of public peace. A petty fine is summarily ordered by the police officer if the suspect does not contest his guilt, but the person punished may contest the fine in a district court.

Most infractions are punishable with a day-fine. For crimes warranting no more than six months in prison, the fine may be summarily ordered by the prosecutor if the suspect does not want the court to handle the case. The process of ordering a day fine is started by a police officer who makes a formal demand for the suspect to be fined. The suspect has one week to contest the demand. If the suspect does not contest the demand, the prosecutor may order a fine which may not be higher than demanded by the police officer. If the suspect contests the demand, the case may be taken to the district court if the prosecutor considers the suspect guilty. If the prosecutor considers the case to merit a term in prison or a higher fine, the case is always taken to the court. If the prosecution or the injured party do not demand a higher punishment than a fine, the district court has a quorum with a single member. The fine is paid to the bank using a giro. A fine ordered in Finland is executable in any European Union member country.

A Finnish fine consists of a minimum of 1 day-fine, up to a maximum of 120 day-fines. If several crimes are punished together, 240 day-fines may be sentenced. The fines may not be sentenced together with a prison sentence, unless the prison sentence is probational. The minimum amount of a day-fine is 6 euros. Usually, the day-fine is one half of daily disposable income. The daily disposable income is considered to be one 60th part of the person's monthly mean income during the year, after taxes, social security payments and a basic living allowance of €255 per month have been deducted. In addition, every person for whose upkeep the fined person is responsible decreases the amount of daily fine by €3. The income of the person is calculated on the basis of the latest taxation data. For speeding in traffic, however, the fine is at least as high as the petty fine, i.e. €115.

The person who is punished with a fine is responsible for giving accurate information concerning their income. Lying about one's income is a crime punishable with a fine or up to three months in prison. The police can, however, access the taxation data of Finnish citizens and permanent residents via a real-time datalink, so the chance of lying successfully is minor. There is no maximum day-fine, which may lead to considerably high fines for high-income persons. For example, in 2001, a Finnish businessman with a yearly income of 10 million euros, received a relatively mild punishment of six day-fines, amounting €26,000, for driving though a red traffic light. In 2009 a businessman was fined €112,000 for travelling at 82 kilometres per hour in an area with a speed limit of 60 kilometres per hour. As speeding is punished with a petty fine if the offender is exceeding the speed limit by up to 20 km/h, but with a day-fine if exceeding the limit by 21 km/h or more, the monetary amount of the fine can increase from €115 to over €100,000 although the actual change in speed is less than 1 km/h. This has given rise to some criticism, most vividly expressed by a Finnish member of parliament, avid motorist Klaus Bremer and other MPs of right-wing parties.

The fines are subject to recovery proceedings. If the fines are still not paid, the court may convert them to a prison sentence. Three day-fines will be converted to one day of imprisonment, ignoring the remainder for any amount of day-fines not divisible by three, and the length of the sentence must be between 4 and 60 days. This "conversion punishment" is only ever applied to court-ordered fines, not those issued by police.

Macau
Article 45 of the Penal Code specifies that a criminal fine shall normally be at least 10 days and at most 360 days. One day-fine costs at least 50 Macanese patacas and at most 10,000 patacas. A court of law imposes the fine based on the economic and financial situations and personal burdens of a convict.

Sweden

United Kingdom
England and Wales experimented with the system for a short period from 1992 to 1993. It was unpopular with both magistrates and the general public, and was soon abandoned. The scheme was replaced by requirements that magistrates consider an offender's means when imposing a fine, just not according to a mathematical formula.

United States
The New York Times reported on an experiment with day fines which took place in 1988 in Staten Island, which was a partnership between the local courts and District Attorney, and the Vera Institute of Justice. In addition to Staten Island, day fines experiments have also been piloted in Maricopa County, Arizona; Bridgeport, Connecticut; Polk County, Iowa; four counties in Oregon; and Milwaukee, Wisconsin. An additional project was set up for Ventura County, California, but never ultimately implemented. According to the National Center for Access to Justice, Oklahoma is the only state in the U.S. that "has taken one or more specific steps to mandate, encourage or facilitate courts’ use of individualized fines (“day fines”) that are scaled according to both the severity of the offense and the individual’s economic status."

See also

 Criminal justice financial obligations, the system of criminal financial punishment typically used by jurisdictions within the United States

References

External links 
 Legal Register Centre - agency responsible for handling day-fines in Finland

Criminal law
Law of Finland
Punishments

de:Tagessatz#Tagess.C3.A4tze im Strafrecht